Bathydorididae is a taxonomic family of dorid nudibranch, shell-less marine gastropod mollusks.

Bathydorididae is the only family in the superfamily Bathydoridoidea, within the clade Gnathodoridacea.

Taxonomy 
Genera in the family Bathydorididae include:
 Bathydoris Bergh, 1884 - type genus. These nudibranchs live in deep water, below 1,500 m.
Bathydoris abyssorum  Bergh, 1884 (type species)
Bathydoris aioca Marcus & Marcus, 1962 
Bathydoris clavigera  Thiele, 1912  (synonym : Prodoris clavigera)
Bathydoris hodgsoni  Eliot, 1907 
Bathydoris ingolfiana  Bergh, 1900 
 Bathydoris japonensis Hamatani & Kubodera, 2010 
Bathydoris patagonica  Kaiser, 1980 
Bathydoris violacea  Baranetz. 1993
Bathydoris vitjazi Minichev, 1969
Prodoris  Baranetz, 1997 
Prodoris clavigera  (Thiele, 1912)

References

Further reading

Belick, Francis P. 1975 Additional opisthobranch mollusks from Oregon. The Veliger 17 (3): 276-277.
Goddard, Jeffrey H.r. 1984. The opisthobranchs of Cape Arago, Oregon, with notes on their biology and a summary of benthic opisthobranchs known from Oregon. The Veliger 27 (2): 143-163.
Lance, James R. 1967. The holotype of the abyssal dorid nudibranch Bathydoris aoica Marcus & Marcus, 1962. The Veliger 9 (4) 410.
Marcus, Ev. & Er. Marcus. 1962. A new species of the Gnathodoridacea. Anais da Academia Brasileira de Ciências 34: 269-275.
Valdés, Ángel, and Hans Bertsch. 2000. Redescription and range extension of Bathydoris aioca Marcus & Marcus, 1962 (Nudibranchia: Gnathodoridoidea). The Veliger 43 (2): 172-178.